Rattled! is the only studio album by New York City punk rock band The Rattlers, released by PVC Records in 1985. The 1997 CD release includes two singles from 1979 and 1983.

Track listing

Personnel
 Mickey Leigh – guitars, lead vocals, keyboards
 Billy Baillie – keyboards, backing vocals
 Dave U. Hall – bass, backing vocals
 Matty Quick – drums, backing vocals
 Michael Harnett - xylophone
 Joey Ramone - vocals (track 7)

References 

1985 debut albums
Albums produced by Tommy Ramone